The Komuz languages are a proposed branch of the Nilo-Saharan language family which would include the Koman languages, the Gumuz languages and the Shabo language, all spoken in eastern South Sudan and Sudan and western Ethiopia. Nilo-Saharan specialists have vacillated on a genealogical relationship between the Koman and Gumuz languages, a relationship called Komuz. Greenberg (1963) had included Gumuz in the Koman language family. Bender (1989, 1991) classified them together in a distant relationship he called Komuz, but by 1996 he had reversed himself, though he kept both groups in core Nilo-Saharan. Dimmendaal (2008) kept them together, though expressed doubts over whether they belonged in Nilo-Saharan, later referring to Gumuz as an isolate (2011).  Ahland (2010, 2012), on the basis of new Gumuz data, resurrected the hypothesis. Blench (2010) independently came to the same conclusion and suggested that the Shabo language might be a third, outlying branch. The classification of Shabo is difficult because of a strong Koman influence on the language that is independent of any genealogical relationship between them. Schnoebelen (2009), moreover, sees Shabo as a likely isolate.

Koman and Gumuz are also grouped together in an automated computational analysis (ASJP 4) by Müller et al. (2013). However, since the analysis was automatically generated, the grouping could be either due to mutual lexical borrowing or genetic inheritance.

Languages
Shabo is included per Blench (2010).

External links
 video of Colleen Ahland speaking on the classification of Koman and Gumuz

References

 Colleen Ahland, "The Classification of Gumuz and Koman Languages", presented at the Language Isolates in Africa workshop, Lyons, December 4, 2010
 Colleen Ahland, 2012. "A Grammar of Northern and Southern Gumuz", doctoral dissertation, University of Oregon.
 Lionel Bender, 1983. "Proto-Koman phonology and lexicon", "Afrika und Übersee" 66: 259–297.
 Lionel Bender, 1991. "Subclassification of Nilo-Saharan". In M. Lionel Bender, ed., Proceedings of the Fourth Nilo-Saharan Linguistics Colloquium, Bayreuth, Aug.30-Sep.2, 1989. NISA 7, 1-35. Hamburg: Helmut Buske Verlag.
 Lionel Bender, 1996. "The Nilo-Saharan languages: a comparative essay", Munich: Lincom Europa.
 Lionel Bender, 2000. "Nilo-Saharan". In Bernd Heine and Derek Nurse, eds., African Languages: An Introduction. Cambridge University Press.
 Roger Blench, 2010. Commentary on Ahland (2010) at the Language Isolates in Africa workshop, Lyons, December 4, 2010
 Gerrit Dimmendaal, 2008. "Language Ecology and Linguistic Diversity on the African Continent", Language and Linguistics Compass 2/5:842.
  Gerrit J. Dimmendaal, 2011. "Historical linguistics and the comparative study of African languages". Philadelphia: John Benjamins.
 Joseph Greenberg, 1963. The Languages of Africa (International Journal of American Linguistics 29.1). Bloomington, IN: Indiana University Press.
 Tyler Schnoebelen, 2009. "(Un)classifying Shabo: phylogenetic methods and results". Peter K. Austin, Oliver Bond, Monik Charette, David Nathan & Peter Sells, eds., Proceedings of Conference on Language Documentation and Linguistic Theory 2. London: SOAS.  (long version, unpublished )

 
Proposed language families